Paul Allison may refer to:
 Paul J. Allison, British-Canadian clinician-scientist and oral surgeon
 Paul D. Allison, American statistician and sociologist